A total lunar eclipse took place on Wednesday, August 26, 1942. The moon passed through the center of the Earth's shadow.

This is the 38th member of Lunar Saros 127. The previous event is the August 1924 lunar eclipse. The next event is the September 1960 lunar eclipse.

Visibility

Related lunar eclipses

Inex series

Saros series
Lunar saros series 127, repeating every 18 years and 11 days, has a total of 72 lunar eclipse events including 54 umbral lunar eclipses (38 partial lunar eclipses and 16 total lunar eclipses). Solar Saros 134 interleaves with this lunar saros with an event occurring every 9 years 5 days alternating between each saros series.

Tritos 
 Preceded: Lunar eclipse of September 26, 1931
 Followed: Lunar eclipse of July 26, 1953

Tzolkinex 
 Preceded: Lunar eclipse of July 16, 1935
 Followed: Lunar eclipse of October 7, 1949

See also 
List of lunar eclipses and List of 21st-century lunar eclipses

External links 
 Saros series 127
 

1942-08
1942 in science
Central total lunar eclipses